The Campeonato Nacional de Andebol Masculino  (English: Men's Handball National Championship), also known simply as Andebol 1 (or Campeonato Placard Andebol 1 for sponsorship reasons), is the premier handball league in Portugal and is overseen by the Portuguese Handball Federation.

The competition was created in 1951 and was formerly named Campeonato Nacional da Primeira Divisão (1951–1982 and 1985–2001), Divisão de Elite (2002–2006), and Liga Portuguesa de Andebol (2001–2009). Seven teams have won the league title since its inception.

FC Porto are the current champions, becoming the most successful team in the competition with 23 titles, after winning the 2020-2021 season, followed by Sporting CP with 21 and ABC with 13.

History

Creation of the league 
Handball was first introduced in Portugal in 1929 and in 1939 the Portuguese Handball Federation is established. During the first half of the 20th century, the sport became increasingly trendy, becoming one of the most important team sports in Portugal, aside football and roller hockey. The increasing number of clubs featuring handball teams had already led to the establishment of regional championships in the regions of Metropolitan Lisbon and Greater Porto, as well as around Coimbra. The interest in defining a "national champion" led the federation to create a small tournament between the best teams of Lisbon and Porto (at first) and Coimbra (in a second phase).

Sporting and Porto dominion until the Carnation Revolution 
Of the 23 championships played before the Carnation Revolution, only three were not won by Sporting CP or FC Porto. The two teams readily established themselves as the top-clubs in the country, growing after their eclecticism. Both teams featured the best Portuguese players of that time, sparking up a North-South rivalry between Porto and Lisbon, respectively.

FC Porto won the first tetracampeonato (4 titles in a row) in the history of the competition. On the other side, Sporting CP won the first pentacampeonato (5 titles in a row) in the history of the Portuguese handball, with a team that became known as "Os Sete Magníficos" (in English, The Seven Magnificent).

A real league in the European handball 
In 1985, the championship assumed a league format disputed with 12 teams. This change in the competition format approximated the Portuguese league to other major European leagues and accounted for a significant increase in competitiveness. This consistent growth was backed by the investments made by multiple clubs, who sought to secure some foreign players (especially from the Balkans) as well as experienced and well-regarded coaches, whose knowledge of the sport allowed a solid increase in playing quality.

The peak of the growth of the club handball in Portugal was achieved by ABC, from Braga, when they reached the final of the first EHF Champions League final in 1994. They lost to CB Cantabria by 45–43. In 1999-00, ABC also reached the semi-finals of the EHF Cup.

League-Federation dispute and decline 
In 2001, the clubs created an independent association, the Liga Portuguesa de Clubes de Andebol (in English, Portuguese Handball Clubs League), whose goal was to oversee a fully professional handball league, called Liga Portuguesa de Andebol (in English, Portuguese Handball League). However, in 2002, the Portuguese Handball Federation disputed the validity of the League and eventually refused accept the Liga Portuguesa de Andebol champions as "national champions".

As a consequence of the dispute, second-tier was renamed to Divisão de Elite (in English, Elite Division) and transformed into the official first-tier of the Portuguese handball. Its champions were declared "Portuguese champions".

The most dramatical consequence was the inability of the big professional clubs playing in Liga Portuguesa de Andebol to enter European Handball Federation competitions.

In 2005, the Federation finally recognised the Liga Portuguesa de Andebol as the first-tier of the Portuguese handball league system and agreed to granting autonomy to the League while overseeing it at the same time.

The fall of the League and the regrowth of club handball 
The Liga Portuguesa de Clubes de Andebol folded in 2008, bringing the Liga Portuguesa de Andebol to an end. The short-lived competition was replaced by the new Andebol 1 (in English, Handball One) under the scope of the Portuguese Handball Federation. Since the rebranding of the championship in the 2009–2010 season, Portuguese club handball regained some of its notoriousness, namely in the international competitions. Sporting CP won the EHF Challenge Cup in 2010 and 2017 and ABC won the competition in 2016, in the first solely-Portuguese European final in the history of handball, beating Benfica by an aggregate of 53–51. ABC had also reached the final of the EHF Challenge Cup in 2015.

In the 2013–14 season, FC Porto became the first Portuguese team to participate in the group stage of the EHF Champions League since 2002. FC Porto, ABC and Sporting CP also participated in the 2015–16, 2016–17 and 2017–18 editions, although none of them passed through the group stage.

Format

Current format 
Since 2016, the competition is disputed in two phases (First Phase and Final Phase).

During the First Phase, the 14 participating teams play themselves twice, in a league schedule, home and away. Each team plays, therefore, 26 matches during this phase. The top-6 teams qualify for the Group A of the Final Phase, whereas the 7th to 14th-placed teams qualify for the Group B of the Final Phase.

For the Final Phase, each team starts this phase of the competition with half of the points earned during the First Phase. During the Final Phase, the teams will play each other twice, in a league schedule, home and away. The Group A consists of the top-6 teams of the First Phase and will determine the final standings from the 1st to 6th-placed team. The Group B consists of the other 8 teams and will determine the final standings from the 7th to the 14th-placed teams.

The two bottom-placed teams in the Final Phase – Group B are relegated to the Second Division.

Currently, the champion qualifies to the EHF Champions League. The 2nd and 3rd-placed to the EHF Cup (the 2nd to the 2nd Qualifying Round and the 3rd to the 1st Qualifying Round). The 4th-placed team qualifies to the EHF Challenge Cup.

Former formats

Early years 
On the first season (1951–52), the championship was played as a knockout tournament between four teams of Metropolitan Greater Lisbon region.

Then, from 1952 to 1962, the championship a mini-league was played between the best two teams of the regional championships of the districts of Lisbon and Porto to determine the national champion.

During the following two seasons, the mini-league was expanded from 8 then to 10 teams, to accommodate teams from the districts of Aveiro and Setúbal and, then, Coimbra.

Regional grouping period 
From the 1962–63 to the 1984–1985 season, the championship was held in two phases. During the regular phase, the teams were distributed for a variable number of groups (2, 3 or 4) according to location criteria. The top teams of each group qualified for a brief Final Phase to determine the national champion.

The 1973–74 season was an exception to this format, as a single mainland championship was established, featuring 12 teams from the continental Portugal. This championship was to serve as a qualifying competition to a final knockout phase, which would include teams from the islands (Azores and Madeira) and the Portuguese colonies. Because of the coup d'état on 25 April and the revolution period that succeeded it, the final phase never happened and the winner of the former round was declared national champion.

Since 1985 
Since the 1985–86 season that the same format has been used with slight changes. The competition has evolved from 12 teams to 10 teams. Then, back to 12 teams and increased to 14 teams in 2016. The regular phase has always been succeeded by a final phase, disputed either in a small league with 4 or 6 teams and in a knockout format. The knockout format was lately tried on the 2015–2016 season, but it was changed back the following season. The format of the final phase (play-offs vs. mini-league) is still a topic of debate between the Portuguese clubs and fans.

Teams
The teams contesting the 2022-23 Andebol 1 season are:

Champions

Portuguese Handball First Division

Portuguese Handball League

Divisão de Elite

Andebol 1 

Note: 
TN: Titles Number

Performances

Italics: Winners of Divisão de Elite, during the League-Federation dispute.

U20 Andebol 1

Champions

Performances

EHF coefficients

The following data indicates Portuguese coefficient rankings between European handball leagues.

Country ranking
EHF League Ranking for 2018/19 season:
 7.  (8)  Macedonian Handball Super League (51.22)
 8.  (9)  Croatian Premier Handball League (42.25)
 9.  (10)  Portuguese Handball First Division (37.33)
 10.  (7)  Slovenian First League of Handball (36.67)
 11.  (12)  Liga Națională (30.89)

Club ranking
EHF Club Ranking as of 18 June 2020:
 10.  Porto (357)
 21.  Sporting CP (255)
 32.  Benfica (185)
 67.  Madeira SAD (92)
 103.  ABC Braga (50)
 109.  Belenenses (48)

See Also 

Men's

 Second Division
 Third Division
 Taça de Portugal
 Supertaça
  Youth Honors

Women's
 First Division
 Taça de Portugal
 Supertaça
  Youth Honors (Women)

Notes

References

1
Sports leagues established in 1951
1951 establishments in Portugal
Professional sports leagues in Portugal